Triplarina paludosa is a species of flowering plant in the myrtle family, Myrtaceae and is endemic to the Blackdown Tableland in Queensland. It is a shrub with lance-shaped to linear leaves, flowers with five sepals, five white petals and fifteen to eighteen stamens.

Description

Taxonomy and naming
Triplarina paludosa was first formally described by Anthony Bean in 1995 and the description was published in the journal Austrobaileya from specimens he collected near Horseshoe Lookout on the Blackdown Tableland in 1993. The specific epithet (paludosa) means "marshy", referring to the species' habitat preference.

Distribution and habitat
This triplarina is endemic to the Blackdown Tableland where it grows near creeks and seepage areas in open forest and woodland.

Conservation status
Triplarina paludosa is classified as of "least concern" under the Queensland Government Nature Conservation Act 1992.

References

paludosa
Flora of Queensland
Plants described in 1995
Taxa named by Anthony Bean